The Wake Forest University School of Law is one of the professional graduate schools of Wake Forest University.  Located in Winston-Salem, North Carolina, Wake Forest University School of Law is a private American Bar Association (ABA) accredited law school and is a member of the Association of American Law Schools (AALS).  The school was established in 1894.  U.S. News & World Report consistently ranks the school among the Top Tier Law Schools in the nation.  The current interim dean is Nell Jessup Newton.

As of 2021, Wake Forest University School of Law has 44 Resident Faculty Members, 43 Extended Faculty Members, 8 Law Librarians, and 20 School Administrators.

The school is known for emphasizing small classes, and the entering class in 2022 had 159 students, divided amongst four sections of approximately 40 students each.  The entering class had a median LSAT score of 165 and media GPA of 3.72.

According to Wake Forest's official ABA-required disclosures, 96.5% of the Class of 2021 obtained full-time, long-term, Bar-required or JD Advantage employment within 10 months after graduation.  Of those graduates, North Carolina, Washington, D.C., and Florida accounted for the most popular employment locations.

The bar passage rate in North Carolina for the Class of 2021 was 95.7% and the overall bar passage rate was 94.27%.

Class Profile 
For the 2022-2023 academic year, Wake Forest University School of Law enrolled 159 first-year students out of 1,808 total applicants.  The incoming class came from 100 different undergraduate colleges and universities from 32 different states, with 67% of students being classified as "out-of-state residents".

The incoming class was featured a high level of diversity with 52% of the class identifying as female and 48% identifying as male.  Additionally, 20% of the incoming class identified themselves as being LGBTQ+ and 19% of the class identified as being an minoritized ethnicity.  54% of the incoming class also reported having at least 1 year of post-undergraduate experience prior to matriculating.

Numerically, the incoming class was also very accomplished with the 75th percentile LSAT score being 166, the median being 165, and the 25th percentile being 159.  The 75th percentile undergraduate GPA was 3.85, the median was 3.72, and the 25th percentile was 3.46.

Publications
The school has three student-run law journals.  The school's flagship journal is the Wake Forest Law Review.  The school also publishes two specialized journals, the Wake Forest Journal of Law & Policy and the Wake Forest Journal of Business and Intellectual Property Law.

Journal membership is determined primarily through a writing competition that is administered at the end of the first-year.  Wake Forest Law Review also extends invitations for membership based on GPA to the top 10% of the first-year class, regardless of performance in the writing competition.  By joining a journal, students are eligible to earn two (2) credit hours per year, in the Spring semester, by serving on the Editorial Board or by writing an original piece of scholarship (i.e. a Note or Comment).

Rankings
The Wake Forest University School of Law is ranked 37th in the 2023 U.S. News & World Report ranking.

Student organizations
 Student Bar Association
 Phi Alpha Delta
 Black Law Students Association
 North Carolina Student Bar Association
 American Constitution Society
 Federalist Society
 Christian Legal Society
 Moot Court Board 
 Trial Bar
 Transactional Law Competition
 Public Interest Law Organization
 Wake Forest Law Review
 Wake Forest Journal of Law & Policy
 Wake Forest Journal of Business and Intellectual Property Law
 Texas Young Lawyer Association National Trial Team
 AAJ Student Trial Advocacy Competition Trial Team
 OUTLaw

Student opportunities
 Metropolitan Externship in Washington, D.C. - Students spend approximately 35 hours per week interning in a government agency or non-governmental organization. In addition to this practice component, students attend a weekly class session, which explores issues common to the interns.
 Summer Study Abroad Programs in London, Venice, and Vienna.
 Inns of Court
 Guardian Ad Litem
 Pro bono Project

Clinics

The law school offers seven legal clinics, or programs that allow students to attain practical legal experience through providing legal services to real clients.
 Appellate Advocacy Clinic - Students represent clients in a variety of appellate courts, including the Fourth Circuit and the Seventh Circuit.  Students handle an actual appeal from start to finish, with advice and assistance from their professor, who is counsel of record.  Students also travel to Washington, D.C., to observe arguments at the United States Supreme Court.
 Child Advocacy Clinic - Students represent children in custody disputes, domestic violence situations, and in issues involving the public school system.
 Community Law and Business Clinic - A new program, this clinic provides law and graduate business students with an opportunity to develop skills needed to practice in the increasingly complex legal and regulatory environment they will encounter as professionals.
 
 Innocence and Justice Clinic - This clinic has its origins in the Innocence Project in which Wake Forest students review and investigate claims of innocence to determine whether DNA evidence existed that could exonerate inmates.
 Civil & Criminal Externship Clinic - Formerly referred to as the Litigation Clinic, students have the opportunity to receive real world practice experience by working with local attorneys. During the semester, all students receive civil placements with local firms, in-house counsel offices, and the Office of the United States Attorney for the Middle District of North Carolina. Students also spend half of their semester working in a criminal placement. These placements have included private firms as well as prosecutors' and public defenders' offices.
Veterans Legal Clinic - Students work with former military services members to upgrade their discharge statuses. The lengthy process involves submitting briefs to the pertinent military discharge review board.

Employment 
According to Wake Forest's official ABA-required disclosures, 84.8% of the Class of 2016 obtained full-time, long-term, Bar-required or JD Advantage employment within 10 months after graduation.

Cost of Attendance
The total cost of attendance (indicating the cost of tuition, fees, and living expenses) at Wake Forest University School of Law for the 2022-2023 academic year is $78,744.  Though Wake Forest University School of Law does not provide any "need-based" scholarships (i.e. scholarship based on income and/or family contribution), most students qualify for and receive some form of "merit based" scholarship (i.e. scholarship based on prior academic performance).

For all students in attendance between 2020-2021, out of 465 students, 443 students received some form of merit scholarship (95% of total students).  Of those students, 122 (26% of total students) received scholarships for an amount less than half the cost of tuition.  Another 288 (62% of total students) received scholarships for amounts between half and full tuition.  And 31 (7% of total students) received scholarships for amounts greater than the cost of tuition.  Of the scholarships provided: the 75th percentile was valued at $42,000 per year, the median was valued at $36,000 per year, and the 25 percentile was valued at $22,250 per year.

Outside of traditional scholarship opportunities, Wake Forest students frequently receive Grad PLUS Loans through Federal Student Aid Programs or participate in various approved Federal Work-Study program opportunities throughout the law school.

Notable alumni 
Kenneth D. Bell (J.D. 1983), Judge of the United States District Court for the Western District of North Carolina
Joseph Branch, Former Chief Justice of the North Carolina Supreme Court
Rhoda Billings (J.D., 1966), Former Justice of the North Carolina Supreme Court
Mary P. Easley (J.D. 1975), Former First Lady of North Carolina
William Earl Britt (LL.B. 1958), Former federal judge for the United States District Court for the Eastern District of North Carolina 
Sidney S. Eagles Jr. (J.D. 1964), Former Justice of the North Carolina Court of Appeals
James P. Cain (J.D. 1984), Former U.S. Ambassador to Denmark
Elizabeth Kay Dillon (J.D. 1986), Federal judge for the United States District Court for the Western District of Virginia
Robert L. Ehrlich (J.D., 1982), Former Governor of and Congressman for the state of Maryland
Rocky Fitzsimmons, member of the West Virginia Senate
Jerome B. Friedman (J.D., 1969), Federal judge for the United States District Court for the Eastern District of Virginia
Kay Hagan (JD, 1978), Former U.S. Senator for the state of North Carolina (2009-2015)
Johnson Jay Hayes (LL.B. 1909), Judge of the United States District Court for the Middle District of North Carolina
Malcolm Jones Howard, (J.D. 1970), Federal judge for the United States District Court for the Eastern District of North Carolina 
Samuel Johnson Howard (J.D. 1976), 8th Bishop of the Episcopal Diocese of Florida
Woodrow Wilson Jones (LL.B. 1937), Federal judge for the Western District of North Carolina
Cheslie Kryst (J.D. 2017), Miss USA 2019 and television presenter
I. Beverly Lake Jr. (J.D. 1960), Former Chief Justice of the North Carolina Supreme Court
John C. Martin (J.D. 1967), Former Chief Judge of the North Carolina Court of Appeals
Warren McGraw (J.D. 1963), Former Chief Justice of the Supreme Court of Appeals of West Virginia and West Virginia Senate President
Robert Burren Morgan (J.D.), Former U.S. Senator for the state of North Carolina (1975–1981)
Anuraag Singhal (J.D. 1989), Judge of the United States District Court for the Southern District of Florida
Emory M. Sneeden (LL.B. 1953), Former Judge of the United States Court of Appeals for the Fourth Circuit
Edwin Monroe Stanley (LL.B., 1931), Former federal judge for the United States District Court for the Middle District of North Carolina 
Charles H. Taylor (J.D., 1966) Former U.S. Representative for the state of North Carolina (1991–2007)
Norwood Tilley (J.D. 1969), Federal judge for the United States District Court for the Middle District of North Carolina
Don Vaughan (J.D., 1979) Former member of the North Carolina State Senate from Greensboro
Hiram Hamilton Ward (LL.B., 1950) Former federal judge for the United States District Court for the Middle District of North Carolina
Samuel Grayson Wilson (J.D. 1974) Federal Judge for the United States District Court for the Western District of Virginia
Christopher R. Barron (J.D.), Co-Founder of GOProud.
Greg Habeeb (J.D., 2001) Member of the Virginia House of Delegates.
Creigh Deeds (J.D., 1984) Member of the Virginia State Senate.
Suzanne Reynolds (J.D., 1977) Dean Emerita and Professor of Law at Wake Forest School of Law.

References

External links

Law schools in North Carolina
Wake Forest University